The Big Stuffed Dog is a 1981 children's film about the adventures of a plush Snoopy.  It aired on NBC as part of its Project Peacock series which featured family-based specials and programming.

Plot
A little boy named Petey takes his big Snoopy doll on his airplane trip, only to lose it after landing at the airport. Petey looks for the doll as it goes on an adventure of its own and is passed around from person to person.

Production
Peanuts creator, cartoonist Charles Schulz, wrote the script. Comparing the experience to the many Peanuts television specials, Schulz said, "When we did The Big Stuffed Dog it was a pleasure working with adult professional actors who took some of the lines I had written and really brought them to life. I'm afraid that many of the child actors don't bring the lines up to the level you would really like."

References

External links 
 

1981 films
1981 comedy-drama films
American children's comedy films
American comedy-drama films
Children's comedy-drama films
Films about dogs
Films directed by Robert Fuest
Peanuts television specials
1980s children's comedy films
1980s English-language films
1980s American films